Roskilde University (abbreviated RUC or RU) is a Danish public university founded in 1972 and located in Trekroner in the Eastern part of Roskilde. The university awards bachelor's degrees, master's degrees, and PhD degrees in a wide variety of subjects within social sciences, the humanities, and natural sciences.

History

The university was founded in 1972 and was initially intended as an alternative to the traditional Danish universities which had been the scene of several student uprisings in the late 1960s. The students considered the traditional universities undemocratic and controlled by the professors and wanted more influence as well as more flexible teaching methods.

In the 1970s the university was known for its very liberal education as opposed to the usual lectures provided by the more traditional universities of Copenhagen and Aarhus. The focus was shifted from traditional lectures to group orientated methods and projects rather than traditional exams.

Back in 1972, these educational ideas were both unorthodox and controversial, but the traditional universities in Denmark have now adopted much of the original RU concept themselves, not least the concept of group project work, which is today a recognised academic method. RU can also be said to have brought to Denmark the Anglo-Saxon concepts of interdisciplinarity and less well-defined boundaries between academic fields.

Organization and administration

The university is governed by a board consisting of 9 members: 5 members recruited outside the university form the majority of the board, 1 member is appointed by the scientific staff, 1 member is appointed by the administrative staff, and 2 members are appointed by the university students. The Rector is appointed by the university board. The rector in turn appoints deans and deans appoint heads of departments. There is no faculty senate and faculty is not involved in the appointment of rector, deans, or department heads. Hence the university has no faculty governance.

Degree programs
Roskilde University offers higher education at bachelor-, master, and PhD levels within four main areas: humanities, humanistic technologies, social science and science. The traditional educational setup at RU was based on two years of general studies in one of the main scientific areas and four years of specialization. Today, the university follows the general educational structure in Denmark based on three years of bachelor studies qualifying for a two-year master study.

Roskilde University has 4 departments (institutes) specializing in very different areas from Mathematics to International Development:
 Department of Communication and Arts (DCA)
 Department of Science and Environment (DSE)
 Department of People and Technology (DPT)
 Department of Social Sciences and Business

The university offers three international bachelor programmes:

 International Bachelor Study Programme in the Humanities
 International Bachelor Study Programme in the Natural Sciences
 International Bachelor Study Programme in Social Science

Rankings
QS World University Rankings 2015/6: Politics & International Studies, 151-200, Communication & Media Studies, 151-200. 
Times Higher Education World University Rankings 2017: ranked 501-600 
Academic Ranking of World Universities 2016: unranked

Notable alumni
Some notable alumni and professors from RUC include:

Andreas Bang Hemmeth (DJ Encore)
Johanne Schmidt-Nielsen, politician
 Lars Hulgård, author
Simon Emil Ammitzbøll-Bille, politician
Vincent F. Hendricks
Hartmut Haberland
Pernille Andersen
Christine Lorentzen
Eyðgunn Samuelsen
Anders Bæksgaard, journalist, political editor at Politiken
Mette Abildgaard, politician

See also
 List of universities and colleges in Denmark
 Open access in Denmark

References

External links
 The website of Roskilde University 
 About Roskilde University 
 History of Roskilde University

 
Roskilde
Education in Roskilde
Educational institutions established in 1972
1972 establishments in Denmark
Buildings and structures in Region Zealand